The fourth cycle of Asia's Next Top Model aired from March to June 2016 on STAR World. The judging panel for this cycle was completely replaced; Thai model Cindy Bishop was appointed as host and head judge, and Indonesian model Kelly Tandiono as a model mentor and judge. Yu Tsai joined the show as its creative consultant.

The cycle featured 14 contestants: three from the Philippines, two each from Indonesia and Thailand, and one each from Hong Kong, Malaysia, Mongolia, Myanmar, Singapore, South Korea and Vietnam. China, India, Japan, Nepal and Taiwan were unrepresented. This is notably the only cycle to feature a contestant from Mongolia. While this is the first of two instances Myanmar was presented. 

The prize package for this cycle included a Subaru XV, a position as the face of TRESemmé, a cover and fashion spread in Harper's Bazaar Singapore and a modeling contract with Storm Model Management in London.

The winner of the competition was 20-year-old Tawan Kedkong, from Thailand.

Auditions
Casting calls were held in three countries, listed below;

September 20 at JW Marriott Hotel Jakarta, Jakarta
October 3 at Space Convention Centre, Bangkok

Contestants were also encouraged to apply for the competition online if they were unable to make an appearance at the live auditions.

Cast

Contestants
(Ages stated are at start of contest)

Judges
 Cindy Bishop (host)
 Kelly Tandiono
 Yu Tsai

Episodes

Results

 The contestant was eliminated outside of judging panel 
 The contestant was eliminated but was saved
 The contestant was eliminated
 The contestant quit the competition
 The contestant was immune from elimination
 The contestant won the competition

Average  call-out order
Episode 13 is not included.

Scores
(Total and average scores on the table only reflect scores calculated from the full sets added during panel)

 Indicates the contestant had the highest score that week
 Indicates the contestant was in the bottom that week
 Indicates the contestant was immune from elimination that week
 Indicates the contestant was originally eliminated that week, but was saved
 Indicates the contestant was eliminated outside of judging panel that week
 Indicates the contestant was eliminated that week
 Indicates the contestant quit the competition that week
 Indicates the contestant won the competition

Bottom two/three

 The contestant quit the competition
 The contestant was eliminated after their first time in the bottom two
 The contestant was eliminated after their second time in the bottom two 
 The contestant was eliminated after their third time in the bottom two
 The contestant was eliminated and placed as a runner-up
 The contestant was eliminated outside of judging panel

Notes

References

External links
Official website
Asia's Next Top Model on STAR World

Asia's Next Top Model
2016 Singaporean television seasons
Television shows filmed in Singapore